China Railways HXD3D (Chinese: 和谐电3D型电力机车 / 和谐D3D型电力机车) is a high power electric locomotive of China rated at 7.5 MW as it uses 6 Toshiba traction motors rated at 1.25 MW. The locomotive is produced by Dalian Locomotive and Rolling Stock Company. Like the China Railways HXD1D, China Railways HXD3D is expected to ease the tension in railway operation of quasi-high speed locomotives, and to fill a gap in China mainland of the actual quasi-high speed application of high power AC locomotives.

Attachment of locomotive

Named locomotive 

 HXD3D-0035: "Lei Feng"
 HXD3D-0631: "Steelers Iron Horse"
 HXD3D-1886: "Zhu De"
 HXD3D-1893: "Mao Zedong"
 HXD3D-1921: "Communist Party Member"

Nickname 
The first number locomotive (0001 number) and locomotive number 8001 have a "rainbow" paint coating. However, other locomotives are using the "orangutan" paint coating. And Chinese railway fans also call it "tomato" because of its red paint.

References

External links 

 HXD3D Express Passenger Electric Locomotive on Main Lines_Dalian Locomotive and Rolling Stock Company
 首批和谐3D型客运电力机车正式投入春运_半月谈网(in Chinese)_January 25th, 2014

Electric locomotives of China
25 kV AC locomotives
CRRC Dalian locomotives
Co-Co locomotives
Railway locomotives introduced in 2012
Standard gauge locomotives of China